Hanover Park is a South African football (soccer) club based in the suburb Hanover Park of Cape Town. They currently play in the National First Division, Coastal Stream, with a home venue at the nearby Wynberg Military Base Stadium, situated in the suburb Wynberg.

External links
Premier Soccer League
NFD Club Info

Association football clubs established in 2005
National First Division clubs
Soccer clubs in Cape Town
2005 establishments in South Africa